"Lesbian Seagull" is a song originally recorded and released on the 1979 Tom Wilson Weinberg album, The Gay Name Game. It gained further fame when it was performed by Engelbert Humperdinck, which appeared on the soundtrack of the 1996 MTV/Paramount film Beavis and Butt-Head Do America.

History
Weinberg wrote the song's words and composed its music, and he originally recorded and released it on his own 1979 album, The Gay Name Game. Weinberg wrote and composed "Lesbian Seagull" in response to a UC Irvine study of long term monogamous lesbian behaviour in seagulls on Santa Barbara Island. Mike Judge, creator-designer of Beavis and Butt-Head, heard the song in a David Letterman "Dave's Record Collection" segment and contacted Weinberg about using it in the film. Judge sings the song as the character David Van Driessen, one of Beavis and Butt-heads teachers. Humperdinck's version, used in the end credits of the film and included on the soundtrack released on the Universal/Geffen Records label, was used as the B-side of the Red Hot Chili Peppers' cover of the Ohio Players' "Love Rollercoaster", which was released as a single in its own right.

The song was later used on The Scott Mills Show, on BBC Radio 1, following Engelbert Humperdinck's participation for the United Kingdom in the 2012 Eurovision Song Contest.

The song's most recent notable use has been as the outro to the popular radio show "Morning Glory with Matty Johns" on SEN Track. Matthew Johns has partially credited the show's success to the song and to Engelbert Humperdinck.

References

External links
 Tom Wilson Weinberg's official site

Engelbert Humperdinck songs
1979 songs
1996 singles
Songs about birds
Lesbian-related songs

"Morning Glory with Matty Jonhs"